Charles I de Croÿ (1455–1527), Count and later 1st Prince of Chimay, was a nobleman and politician from the Low Countries in the service of the House of Habsburg.

Career
Charles was born in the House of Croÿ as eldest son of Philip I of Croÿ-Chimay and Walburga of Moers. He was knighted by Maximilian of Austria at the eve of the Battle of Guinegate (1479). In this battle, he was almost killed when his stirrup broke and he was thrown to the ground. He was saved by Maximilian, Josse de Lalaing and a few Germans who came to his rescue, risking being enveloped themselves.

His loyalty to Maximilian and Philip the Fair was appreciated by the Habsburgs. In 1486, Maximilian raised Charles's County of Chimay to Principality. Charles was from then on a Prince of the Holy Roman Empire. Furthermore, in 1491 he became a Knight in Order of the Golden Fleece. In 1500, Charles had the honor of being the godfather at the baptism of Charles V. He became tutor of the young Charles, but because of frictions with the prince's aunt Margaret, he resigned in 1509 in favour of his cousin William de Croÿ.

Charles was in 1519 one of the negotiators during the talks which led to a military alliance with John II, Duke of Cleves. He was also stadtholder of the County of Hainaut and governor of Valenciennes but he resigned in 1521 in favour of his son-in-law Philippe II de Croÿ.

Marriage and Children
Charles married Louise d'Albret, daughter of Alain I of Albret. 
They had eight children of which only two daughters survived:
 Anne (1501–1539), married with Philippe II de Croÿ, Duke of Aarschot and jure uxoris next Prince of Chimay
 Margaret (1508–1549), married in 1528 with Charles II de Lalaing, second count of Lalaing

References

Sources

1455 births
1527 deaths
Knights of the Golden Fleece
Princes of Chimay